Carolina Eliana Videla Osorio (22 December 1968) is a Chilean social worker who was elected as a member of the Chilean Constitutional Convention.

See also
 List of members of the Chilean Constitutional Convention

References

External links
 

Living people
21st-century Chilean politicians
21st-century Chilean women politicians
Communist Party of Chile politicians
Santo Tomás University alumni
Members of the Chilean Constitutional Convention
1968 births